Irving Gottlieb Cheslaw (December 5, 1921July 2, 2013) was the American Chargé d'Affaires ad interim to Jamaica beginning in on August 16, 1962, and the Ambassador Extraordinary and Plenipotentiary to Trinidad and Tobago (1979-1981).

Cheslaw graduated from UCLA and earned a Ph.D. from Columbia University.

Bangladesh

According to the Kashmir Observer, Cheslaw was Chargé d'Affaires in Dhaka in 1975.  After much turmoil in the region, and concerned about India intervening, Nazrul Islam, acting foreign secretary of Bangladesh, was instructed “to seek U.S. support to discourage New Delhi. He was to request that America convey Bangladesh's feelings regarding the possible Indian move to China and Pakistan so that they could mobilize support from the Muslim countries. Accordingly, Islam asked Irving G. Cheslaw, U.S. chargé d'affaires in Dhaka, for support to checkmate any Indian invasion.“

References

Ambassadors of the United States to Bangladesh
Ambassadors of the United States to Jamaica
Ambassadors of the United States to Trinidad and Tobago
University of California, Los Angeles alumni
Columbia University alumni